Jawad , YL or Yamine L'artiste born on April 6, 1996 in Metz. He is a French rapper who gained fame with his freestyle during All Stars events in Marseille. His release Traficante was used in the soundtrack of the film Chouf released in October 2016. He has collaborated with a great number of rappers.

Discography

Singles

Other charted songs

*Did not appear in the official Belgian Ultratop 50 charts, but rather in the bubbling under Ultratip charts.

Featured in

References

External links
Facebook

Rappers from Bouches-du-Rhône
French songwriters
Male songwriters
Living people
Year of birth missing (living people)
French people of Algerian descent
Musicians from Marseille